FC Prishtina debuted in European football in their match against Swedish Side Norriköping. On 5 July 2018, Prishtina beat the Gibraltarian side Europa at Adem Jashari Olympic Stadium in Mitrovica and became the first Kosovan side to win a UEFA Europa League match. Their most successful campaign was when they reached the first round of the UEFA Champions League qualifying rounds in the 2020–21 season.

Matches

References 

Football in Kosovo